Quinolizinium refers to the heterocyclic cation with the formula .  The cation is isoelectronic and nearly isostructural with naphthalene, the difference being the replacement of one of the two carbons at the fusion positions with N+.  The parent quinolizine has not been isolated but salts of these aromatic quinolizinium compounds are well known.  Several syntheses begin with 2-substituted pyridines and involve N-alkylation and various dehydrogenation reactions.  The quinolizinium core is represented in the berberine family of natural products.   It is formally derived from the elusive quinolizines by hydrde abstraction. According to X-ray crystallography of the hexafluorophosphate salt, which is colorless,  is planar.

Reactions
Being a cation, quinolinizium resists electrophilic attack, although it can be brominated.  Catalytic hydrogenation gives quinolizidine.

References

Pyridinium compounds